The PSBB Millennium School, abbreviated as PSBBMS, is a Central Board of Secondary Education (CBSE) affiliated school in Gerugambakkam and GST Road, Chennai, India. The school was founded by Mr.Shantanu Prakash, an educationist, and an ed-tech pioneer. He is also the founder of Educomp Solutions Ltd. The PSBB Millennium School is a collaborative venture between the Bala Bhavan Educational Trust that runs the PSBB Group of Schools and the Learning Leadership Foundation. Education World ranking for 2012 places the school to be the 84th best day school in the country, 9th in the Southern Zone and 9th in the City of Chennai.

Branches

GST Road
The tiny tots of the Nursery function out of the GST Road Campus. The open space for playing is equipped with play material that helps in the development of their gross motor skills.. With Indian Music, Western Music, Dance and Role Play as part of the curriculum the children acquire knowledge through play-way methodology.

Gerugambakkam
The State-of-the-art Campus in Gerugambakkam is spread over 5 acres of land, with ample place for play, big, airy classrooms with ventilation, covered play area for the younger children, ground for a team to play football with more than one exit and entry point. The School through the daily transactions and practices provides a distinctive educational environment that enables young persons to grow not only in intellectual capacities, but also in other dimensions of their being. While developing the students' intellectual faculties, there is a conscious effort towards creating a wider awareness of the world and giving space for the development of the aesthetic, moral and emotional 
.

Curriculum
The school is affiliated to Central Board of Secondary Education. Till the grade of X, students can choose two languages. Hindi is compulsory as either Second or Third Language.

Groups for class XI and XII
Core English is Compulsory

 Biology, Maths, Physics, Chemistry
 Biology, Entrepreneurship, Physics, Chemistry
 Computer Science, Maths, Physics, Chemistry
 Accountancy, Business Studies, Economics, Entrepreneurship
 Accountancy, Business Studies, Economics, Maths

Houses
Students are sorted into four different houses
   Emerald (Green)
   Sapphire (Blue)
   Ruby  (Red)
   Topaz  (Yellow)   
These houses are awarded points in various sport events including the performance in Sports Day conducted every year. The house with most points, wins the House Trophy.

Clubs
The PSBB Millennium School has the following clubs in which the students take part. These clubs ensures that the students enhance their skills in the concerned activities conducted by the club.
 Debate Club : Club which enhances the speaking and debating skills. Aims to reduce stage fear and induces confidence.
 Interact Club : Sponsored by the Rotary Club of Madras, the Interact Club was established for the enhancement and welfare of the society and surroundings. 
 School Band : Performs in reputed events across the city. Notable personality in the School Band of Gerugambakkam includes RJ Shyam Renganathan.
Disciplinary Committee: Formed in June 2012 in the Gerugambakkam Campus, under the guidance of Mrs.Rukmini Shreedharan, headed by Amogh Simha and Ms.R.Mayuri Rao bringing in notable contributions. The team also consists of Ms.Preeti Sivakumar and Ms. Bhuvaneshwari, who has brought in notable developments.

See also
Padma Seshadri Bala Bhavan

References 

Private schools in Chennai
Educational institutions established in 2005
2005 establishments in Tamil Nadu